Brogi is an Italian surname. Notable people with the surname include:

Angelica Brogi (born 1998), Italian professional racing cyclist
Giacomo Brogi (1822–1881), Italian photographer
Giulio Brogi (born 1935), Italian actor
Marco Dino Brogi (born 1932), Vatican diplomat 
Marina Brogi (born 1967), Italian economist

Italian-language surnames